Peter Kremer (born 18 February 1958 in Brilon, North Rhine-Westphalia) is a German theatre and television actor.

Filmography

External links

Above The Line Agency Berlin 

1958 births
Living people
People from Brilon
German male television actors